The 2017–18 Louisiana–Monroe Warhawks men's basketball team represented the University of Louisiana at Monroe in the 2017–18 NCAA Division I men's basketball season. The Warhawks, led by eighth-year head coach Keith Richard, played their home games at Fant–Ewing Coliseum as members of the Sun Belt Conference. They finished the season 16–16, 9–9 in Sun Belt play to finish in a tie for fifth place. They defeated Arkansas State in the first round of the Sun Belt tournament before losing in the quarterfinals to Georgia Southern. They received an invitation to the CollegeInsider.com Tournament where they lost in the first round to Austin Peay.

Previous season
The Warhawks finished the 2016–17 season 9–24, 2–16 in Sun Belt play to finish in last place. In the Sun Belt tournament, they defeated Arkansas State before losing to Texas State in the quarterfinals.

Roster

Schedule and results

|-
!colspan=9 style=| Non-conference regular season

|-
!colspan=9 style=| Sun Belt Conference regular season

|-
!colspan=9 style=| Sun Belt tournament

|-
!colspan=9 style=| CIT

References

Louisiana–Monroe Warhawks men's basketball seasons
Louisiana-Monroe
Louisiana-Monroe
Louisiana-Monroe
Louisiana-Monroe